Bertha Koster-thoe Schwartzenberg en Hohenlansberg (1891-1993) was a Dutch sculptor.

Biography 
Schwartzenberg was born on 	8 January 1891 in Rothenburg. She studied with Joseph Mendes da Costa. She was married to fellow artist  (1885-1969). Her work was included in the 1939 exhibition and sale Onze Kunst van Heden (Our Art of Today) at the Rijksmuseum in Amsterdam.

Schwartzenberg died in 1993 at Hilversum at the age of 102.

References

External links
image of Schwartzenberg's work at ArtNet

1891 births
1993 deaths
20th-century Dutch women artists